Sebastian is a 1968 British spy film directed by David Greene, produced by Michael Powell, Herbert Brodkin and Gerry Fisher, and distributed by Paramount Pictures. The motion picture is based on a story by Leo Marks, and Gerald Vaughan-Hughes wrote the screenplay.

Plot
Mr. Sebastian is a former Oxford professor, who in the late 60s directs the all-female decoding office of British Intelligence.  One day, while running through the streets of Oxford to attend the bestowing of an honorary degree on his friend the Prime Minister, Sebastian runs into Rebecca (Becky) Howard and her jeep.  After insulting Sebastian on the spot, Becky is intrigued by him and follows him to the ceremony.  After Becky is able to spell her own name backwards, he gives her a phone number to call if she wants an unspecified "job."

Becky calls the number, and after Sebastian's personal assistant Miss Elliott describes the job as being part of the "civil service," Becky is turned off by the idea.  Overcoming her concerns, she calls again, and after a successful interview, obtains a job deciphering codes used by secret agents and foreign spies. Once settled in her new job, Becky slowly starts to fall for the aloof Mr Sebastian.  However, problems arise when Gen. John Phillips, Head of Security, accuses Sebastian's senior Jewish decoder Elsa Shahn of being a poor security risk, because of her left-wing Communist leanings.

Sebastian convinces the Head of Intelligence to retain Shahn despite Phillips' objections, expressing how vital Shahn is to the decoding office and reaffirming that she enjoys his full confidence.  Eventually, Becky and Sebastian engage in an affair, which upsets Sebastian's longtime girlfriend (and washed-up pop singer) Carol Fancy.  Ultimately, Shahn betrays Sebastian's trust by providing recently decoded information to a left-wing political organisation.  When confronted with the security breach by the Head of Intelligence and by Phillips' watchdog Jameson, Sebastian tenders his resignation and breaks up with Becky, thinking she was on to him.  He leaves London and returns to his teaching position at Oxford University.  Months later, Sebastian is visited at Oxford by the Head of Intelligence, who convinces Sebastian to return, temporarily, to the decoding office to help the Americans decipher some unidentified signals emanating from a Sputnik-type Russian spy satellite circling the earth.  To prepare for this assignment, Sebastian visits a secret British eavesdropping installation, where he meets the American Ackerman, who is working on the project.

One day, while looking for Becky, who has also left the decoding department after Sebastian's resignation and break-up,  Sebastian runs into Carol, who invites him to a party at her apartment "for old times sake".  At the party, Sebastian is drugged with LSD and lured to the top of the building by Toby, who unknown to Sebastian, is both Carol's lover and a foreign agent.  Just as the hallucinating Sebastian is about to jump off the building ledge to his death at Toby's insistence, he is saved by Gen. Phillips, who had been tailing both men, and Toby is arrested.  Sebastian returns to the decoding office, and finds out where Becky lives.  While visiting Becky, Sebastian discovers that he is the father of her newborn baby.  During this visit, a noise from the baby's rattle provides Sebastian with the solution to the Soviet spy satellite's signals, which he eventually breaks with the help of his faithful group of decoding girls, who are summoned to Becky's apartment to decipher the Soviet code.

Cast
Dirk Bogarde as Sebastian
Susannah York as Rebecca (Becky) Howard
Lilli Palmer as Elsa Shahn
John Gielgud as Head of Intelligence
Nigel Davenport as General John Phillips
Janet Munro as Carol Fancy 
Ronald Fraser as Toby
John Ronane as Jameson
Donald Sutherland as Ackerman
Margaret Johnston as Miss Elliott
Ann Beach as Pamela
Ann Sidney as Naomi
Veronica Clifford as Ginny
Alan Freeman as TV Chairman
Hayward Morse as Gavin
Portland Mason as "UG" Girl
James Belchamber as Man with Dog

Production
It was filmed in location in Oxford, London, Jodrell Bank and at Twickenham Film Studios, St Margarets, Twickenham, Middlesex, England.

Release
The film debuted in New York City, New York on 24 January 1968.

Reception
Critical reaction to the film was generally mild.  In his 12 March 1968 review, Chicago Sun Times critic Roger Ebert said [Sebastian] "is a movie that moves confidently in three directions, arriving nowhere with a splendid show of style."  Ebert feels the film starts as a thriller about code-cracking operations, then it becomes a love affair between Bogarde and York, then there is the leak to the left-wing activist group by Palmer, and "in spectacular and tender denouement," Bogarde saves the free world by cracking the Soviet satellite code that resembles his baby's rattle noise. Renata Adler of the New York Times was similarly lukewarm, calling Sebastian "a medium saturation put-on ... one of the problems with this sort of movie is the enormous pressure that it puts on the audience to have a good time over almost nothing."  She concludes her review by writing, "If only people wouldn't try to spoof everything at once, but concentrate on doing a thought-out funny thing or two." Variety had essentially the same problem, complaining that even though the central code-breaking material had "potent angles for a strong film, but, herein, story touches so many bases that it never really finds a definite concept."    Even its star Dirk Bogarde called the film a "non-event" at the time of its release.

References

External links 
 
 

British spy films
1960s spy films
1968 films
Cold War films
Films set in London
Films set in Oxford
Films directed by David Greene
Films scored by Jerry Goldsmith
Cryptography in fiction
1960s English-language films
Films shot at Twickenham Film Studios
Paramount Pictures films
1960s British films